The Thomas Grant Harbison House is a historic house at 2930 Walhalla Road, just outside Highlands, North Carolina.  The two-story wood-frame house was built in 1921 for the botanist Thomas Grant Harbison (1862-1936), who was responsible for some of the surviving plantings, including a stand of the endangered Torreya taxifolia, on the extant  property.  The south (street-facing) facade is five bays across, with a two-story porch sheltering the center three bays and the entrance.  The north-facing facade has a similar porch that is only a single story.  The house remained in the Harbison family until 1985.

The house was listed on the National Register of Historic Places in 2008.

See also
National Register of Historic Places listings in Macon County, North Carolina

References

Houses on the National Register of Historic Places in North Carolina
Houses completed in 1921
Houses in Macon County, North Carolina
National Register of Historic Places in Macon County, North Carolina